COPE, an acronym for Cadena de Ondas Populares Españolas ("People's Radiowaves of Spain Network") formerly called Radio Popular, is a Spanish language radio station. It is the second most listened to in Spain's generalist radio. Owned by the Spanish Episcopal Conference company "Radio Popular SA", belongs to the "Group COPE" with music stations Cadena 100, Rock FM and Megastar FM, in addition to Spain's generalist TV channel Trece. The station is associated with Spain's journal Diario ABC.

Created with the aim of offering religious services, since the 1980s its programming has evolved into the model of conventional general radio, while maintaining programs with religious content, such as El Espejo (The Mirror) of José Luis Restán and La linterna de la Iglesia (The Lantern of the Church) of Faustino Catalina, especially on Sundays in the day when Holy Mass and special dates News Church and Catholic liturgical calendar as Christmas and Easter is issued. Its editorial guideline is the promotion of the views of the hierarchy of the Spanish Catholic Church.

See also 
 Radio Maria

External links

 

 
COPE
Catholic Church in Spain
Radio stations established in 1960
1960 establishments in Spain
Catholic radio stations